Alba de Tormes is a municipality in the province of Salamanca, western Spain, part of the autonomous community of Castile and León. The town is on the River Tormes upstream from the city of Salamanca. Alba gave its name to one of Spain's most important dukedoms, who had their ancestral seat in the Castillo de los Duques de Alba. St Teresa of Ávila died at a convent she founded in the town and is buried there.

From the 12th to the 19th century, the monastery of San Leonardo was located outside the walls of Alba.

Notable people
 Fernando Álvarez de Toledo, 3rd Duke of Alba
 saint Teresa of Ávila died at Alba
 saint John of the Cross
 Eloíno Nácar Fúster, priest and Bible translator

Pictures

See also
 Battle of Alba de Tormes

References

Municipalities in the Province of Salamanca